Trigonosporus is a genus of cnidarians belonging to the family Myxobolidae.

Species:

Trigonosporus acanthogobii 
Trigonosporus zhejiangensis

References

Cnidarian genera
Myxobolidae